Dar Derafsh-e Mohammad-e Amin Mirza (also Romanized as Dār Derafsh-e Moḩammad-e Amīn Mīrzā; also known as Dār Derafsh-e Moḩammad-e Amīn) is a village in Baladarband Rural District, in the Central District of Kermanshah County, Kermanshah Province, Iran. At the 2006 census, its population was 231, in 52 families.

References 

Populated places in Kermanshah County